Coloncito is a town in the Panamá Oeste Province of Panama.

Sources 
World Gazeteer: Panama – World-Gazetteer.com

Populated places in Panamá Province